Chitwan Tigers is a professional cricket franchise based in Chitwan, Nepal, that plays in the Everest Premier League. It is owned by the IDS Group Pvt Ltd. National players like Dipendra Singh Airee, Dilip Nath and Lalit Singha Bhandari as well as international players like Paul Stirling of Ireland and former U-19 captain of the England Cricket Team, Max Holden, have been part of the team, while Subash Khakurel was the manager, . In December 2018, the franchise signed a sponsorship deal with Tensberg beer. Chitwan Tigers won their maiden title of Everest Premier League after defeating Pokhara Rhinos by 4 wickets in the 2021 Everest Premier League.

References

Everest Premier League
Cricket in Nepal
2017 establishments in Nepal